The Ottoman–Persian War was a conflict between the forces of the Safavid Empire and those of the Ottoman Empire from 1730 to 1735. After Ottoman support had failed to keep the Ghilzai Afghan invaders on the Persian throne, the Ottoman possessions in western Persia, which were granted to them by the Hotaki dynasty, came under risk of re-incorporation into the newly resurgent Persian Empire. The talented Safavid general, Nader, gave the Ottomans an ultimatum to withdraw, which the Ottomans chose to ignore. A series of campaigns followed, with each side gaining the upper hand in a succession of tumultuous events that spanned half a decade. Finally, the Persian victory at Yeghevard made the Ottomans sue for peace and recognize Persian territorial integrity and Persian hegemony over the Caucasus.

Events 
In the spring of 1730, Nader attacked the Ottomans and regained most of the territory lost during the collapse of the Safavid Empire in the late 1720s. The Abdali Afghans which had been subdued in an earlier campaign rebelled and besieged Mashhad, forcing Nader to suspend his campaign and save his brother, Ebrahim who was trapped in Mashhad. It took Nader fourteen months to defeat the Abdali Afghans, who put up fierce resistance.

Relations between Nader and the Shah had declined as the latter grew jealous of his general's military successes. While Nader was absent in the east, Tahmasp tried to assert himself by launching a foolhardy campaign to recapture Yerevan. He ended up losing all of Nader's recent gains to the Ottomans, and signed a treaty ceding Georgia and Armenia in exchange for Tabriz. Nader saw that the moment had come to ease Tahmasp from power. He denounced the treaty, seeking popular support for a war against the Ottomans. In Isfahan, Nader got Tahmasp drunk then showed him to the courtiers, asking if a man in such a state was fit to rule. In 1732 he forced Tahmasp to abdicate in favor of the Shah's baby son, Abbas III, to whom Nader became regent.

Nader decided he could win back the territory in Armenia and Georgia by seizing Ottoman Baghdad and then offering it in exchange for the lost provinces, but his plan went badly amiss when his army was routed by the Ottoman general Topal Osman Pasha near the city in 1733. Nader decided he needed to regain the initiative as soon as possible to save his position because revolts were already breaking out in Persia. He faced Topal again and defeated and killed him. He then besieged Ganja in the northern provinces, earning a Russian alliance against the Ottomans. Nader scored a great victory over a superior Ottoman force at the Battle of Yeghevārd and by the summer of 1735, Armenia and Georgia were his again. In March 1735, he signed a treaty with the Russians in Ganja by which the latter agreed to withdraw all of their troops from Persian territory.

Aftermath 
The success of Nader's campaigns were such that his prestige swayed many of the Persian elites, and he capitalised on the opportunity to overthrow the Safavids and establish his own, the Afsharid dynasty. Nader's next campaign took him to Qandahar where he overthrew the Ghilzai tribe's ruling Hotaki dynasty once and for all before going on to invade India. Nader also launched his first campaign against the Lezgis during the Perso-Ottoman war of 1730–1735.

See also
 Ottoman–Hotaki War (1726–1727)
 Afsharid–Ottoman War (1743–1746)
 Ottoman–Persian Wars
 Russo-Turkish War (1735–1739)

References 

 
Military operations involving the Crimean Khanate
History of the Caucasus
Conflicts in 1730
Conflicts in 1731
Conflicts in 1732
Conflicts in 1733
Conflicts in 1734
Conflicts in 1735
1730 in the Ottoman Empire
1731 in the Ottoman Empire
1732 in the Ottoman Empire
1733 in the Ottoman Empire
1734 in the Ottoman Empire
1735 in the Ottoman Empire
1730 in Iran
1731 in Iran
1732 in Iran
1733 in Iran
1734 in Iran
1735 in Iran
Campaigns of Nader Shah